Eila Pellinen or Eila Reima (6 August 1938, in Sulkava, Finland – 10 April 1977, in Espoo) was a Finnish singer. Her song "Onni jonka annoin pois" (The Luck I Gave Away) was a hit.

Discography
 Tuula ja Eila (1957)
 Eila Pellistä tapaamassa (1958)
 Eila ja Jorma (1959)
 Eila Pellinen (1977)
 Unohtumattomat (1998)
 Kultaiset korvarenkaat (1998)

1938 births
1977 deaths
People from Sulkava
20th-century Finnish women singers